The Bacardi cocktail is a cocktail made primarily with Bacardi Superior.  It is served as a "pre-dinner" cocktail.

History
The Bacardí Cocktail was originally the same as the daiquiri, containing rum, lime juice, and sugar; The Grenadine version of the Bacardí Cocktail originated in the US, while the original non-red Bacardí company recipe originated from Cuba.

On 28 April 1936, the New York Supreme Court ruled that the drink must contain Bacardí rum to be called a Bacardí cocktail.

See also

 List of cocktails
 List of cocktails (alphabetical)

References

Cocktails with white rum
Cocktails with lime juice
Cocktails with grenadine